A constitutional referendum was held in Liechtenstein on 1 July 2012 concerning limiting the extensive veto powers held by the Prince of Liechtenstein. The proposals were rejected by 76% of voters.

Background
Prior to the 2011 referendum on abortion, Regent Alois had threatened to veto the change to the law to allow voluntary abortion in the first twelve weeks of pregnancy even if the referendum passed.

The question was agreed on 9 February, and 1,732 signatures were collected between 29 March and 9 May. Of these, 1,726 were declared valid, exceeding the 1,500 required to force a referendum. The Landtag rejected the law on 23 May by a vote of 18 to 7 and subsequently set the date of the referendum.

Proposed changes
The proposed changes would have modified articles 9, 65, 66 and 112 of the constitution. Article 9 stated "Every law requires for its validity the sanction of the Prince", and would have been amended to add "or approval in a referendum." Article 65 would have had the sentence "If the sanction of the Prince is not received within six months, it shall be deemed to be denied" removed.

Campaign
As a result, an initiative called "Damit deine Stimme zählt" ("So that your voice counts") was launched to change the constitution to prevent the Prince from vetoing legislation approved in referendums. To counter the campaign, opponents of the change set up a group called "Für Gott, Fürst und Vaterland" ("For God, prince and fatherland").

The Princely family threatened to veto the referendum if it resulted in a vote in favour of removing the veto, whilst Alois threatened to resign if it passed.

Results

References

2012 referendums
Referendums in Liechtenstein
2012 in Liechtenstein
Constitutional referendums
July 2012 events in Europe